Hoek van Holland Haven  (Hook of Holland Harbour) is a metro station on Line B of the Rotterdam Metro, in Hook of Holland (Hoek van Holland), Rotterdam, South Holland. Trains connect with the Stena Line Dutchflyer boat service to Harwich International in England. Until 1 April 2017, it was a railway station served by Nederlandse Spoorwegen.  On 30 September 2019, it reopened as the western terminus of RET Metro Line B.    Work is underway to extend the line further west to a new Hoek van Holland Strand station and to relocate the platforms to the northwest of their current location along the historical building, so that they are on the new section of the line.

Train services
As of 2019, metro service operates every 20 minutes throughout the day to Nesselande, via Beurs.

Until 2017 rail service from Rotterdam Centraal railway station operated every 30 minutes. The service continued on to Hoek van Holland Strand railway station 600 metres further west.

Ferry services

!Previous!!!!Line!!!!Next

References

External links
Dutch Public Transport journey planner

Rotterdam Metro stations
Railway stations opened in 1893
Railway stations on the Hoekse Lijn